The 1866 Pennsylvania gubernatorial election occurred on October 9, 1866. Incumbent governor Andrew Gregg Curtin, a Republican, was not running for re-election. Republican candidate John W. Geary defeated Democratic candidate Hiester Clymer to become Governor of Pennsylvania.

Results

References

1866
Pennsylvania
Gubernatorial
October 1866 events